St Mary-at-Finchley Church is the Church of England parish church for Finchley. It is located in Hendon Lane, in the town centre, near Finchley Library.

History

The church was established sometime in the 12th century. There is reference to a church here in 1274, and evidence of a building even before then. By 1356 it was dedicated to St Mary. The building has been altered many times since its foundation and the oldest parts, the north wall and the tower (which seems to have had a steeple during the 16th and 17th centuries), date from the reign of King Henry VII.

There is an ambry, now in the north wall, and a font bowl, rescued in the 19th century from the rectory grounds, having been buried there during the English Civil War. They are both Norman.

In 1872 the church was enlarged. In 1878 Henry Willis & Sons provided the church with its current organ.

Bombing during the London Blitz of 1940 led to the substantial rebuilding of the church in 1953. The east end was largely destroyed and the stained glass had to be replaced. Caroe and Partners provided a new altar, reredos, parclose screen and pulpit. The organ was in a poor state after the bombing and moved to the west end. Major restoration work to the organ was completed in 2011.

The church has been a grade II* listed building since 1949.

To commemorate the current millennium, in 2000 a special wall hanging was made which now hangs in the church. It depicts all the various groups involved in the life of St Mary-at-Finchley at the end of the twentieth century. There is a key to the symbols on the wall beside the hanging.

Monuments and burials
The oldest monument is a brass plate to Richard Prate (d. 1487), and there is a marble effigy of Alexander King (d. 1618) and his wife. Another brass, of Thomas Sanny, dated 1509, unusually reproduces part of his will. Other notable monuments include those of the Allen family, owners of Finchley's Manor House.

In the churchyard are the graves of Thomas Payne, the radical and bookseller, and Major John Cartwright, the political reformer.

See also
History of Church End, Barnet

References

External links 

Church of England church buildings in the London Borough of Barnet
Diocese of London
Saint Mary
12th-century church buildings in England
Churches bombed by the Luftwaffe in London
Grade II* listed buildings in the London Borough of Barnet
Grade II* listed churches in London
History of the London Borough of Barnet